The Centre for Integrated Photonics (CIP) was a research and development centre for photonic devices. It was based in Phoenix House at Adastral Park in Martlesham, UK. It was bought by Huawei in 2012, between 2003 and 2012 it was owned by EEDA, prior to that it was owned by Corning Incorporated.

References
About CIP https://web.archive.org/web/20120128074058/http://www.ciphotonics.com/about
Huawei purchase CIP, retrieved from EADT 27/1/12 http://www.eadt.co.uk/business/chinese_ict_group_huawei_buys_centre_for_integrated_photonics_at_bt_s_adastral_park_1_1187669

Photonics
Research institutes in the United Kingdom
Huawei